Beryozovka is a rural locality (a village) in Kuganaksky Selsoviet, Sterlitamaksky District, Bashkortostan, Russia. The population was 3 as of 2010. There are 2 streets.

Geography 
Beryozovka is located 40 km north of Sterlitamak (the district's administrative centre) by road. Mikryukovka is the nearest rural locality.

References 

Rural localities in Sterlitamaksky District